Caitlin Jade Foord (born 11 November 1994) is an Australian professional soccer player who plays as a forward for FA Women's Super League club Arsenal and the Australia national team, the Matildas. She became the youngest Australian to play at a World Cup when she represented Australia at the 2011 FIFA Women's World Cup at the age of 16.

In 2011, Foord was named 2011 FIFA Women's World Cup Best Women's Young Player, Asian Women's Young Footballer of the Year, and Football Federation Australia's U20 Women's Footballer of the Year. In 2016, she was awarded Asian Women's Footballer of the Year by the Asian Football Confederation (AFC).

Early life
Raised with her sister Jamie by their mother Simone in Shellharbour, a suburb 100 kilometres south of Sydney in the Illawarra region of New South Wales, Foord attended Illawarra Sports High School. Her mother would frequently drive Foord three-four hours round-trip to Sydney for training and games: "She'd pick me up straight after school and drive me to Sydney Olympic Park and back four times a week for training – and again on the weekend for a game." Her sister Jamie recommended to their mother to let Caitlin try football after seeing her play on the playground at school with boys. "She was just doing so many sports. We took her down and signed her up for the Warilla Wanderers ... I think in the first game she scored six goals." Foord was the only member of her family to play football.

Foord played for local teams Illawarra Stingrays and the Sutherland Sharks before spending some quality time at the New South Wales Institute of Sport. In 2009, she was named Junior Sports Star of the Year at the Shellharbour Sports Awards. She also played futsal as played for the NSW Under 13 team who competed in the Australian Championships in Canberra. At age 13, she earned her first cap for Australia's under-17 national team.

Foord grew up watching the National Rugby League (NRL).

Club career

Central Coast Mariners, 2009
At the age of 16, Foord signed with Central Coast Mariners ahead of the 2009 W-League season, but did not play in a match for the club.

Sydney FC, 2010–14

With the announcement that the Central Coast Mariners would not field a women's team in the 2010–11 W-League season, Foord, along with fellow Mariners players Teresa Polias, Lydia Vandenbergh, and Renee Rollason, all switched to nearby club, Sydney FC. Foord spent four straight seasons with Sydney FC, she appeared in 44 games and scored 10 goals.

Foord scored her first goal for Sydney FC during a 4–1 win against Adelaide United on 20 November 2010. It was her only goal during the 2010–11 season. She was a starting player in 10 of the 11 games she played. Sydney finished first in the league with a  record.

During 2011–12 W-League season, Foord started in five of the eleven matches she played and scored two goals.  On 12 November, she scored a goal in a 4–1 win against Newcastle Jets pouncing on an errant back pass from the Jets defence and coolly slotting the ball into goal. Sydney FC finished third during the regular season with a  record.

Returning to Sydney for the 2012–13 W-League season, Foord scored three goals in eleven matches. During a match against Melbourne Victory on 8 December, she scored the game-opening game in the fifth minute. Sydney finished in fourth place during the regular season with a  record. After defeating Brisbane Roar 3–2 in the semi-finals, Foord helped Sydney FC clinch the championship title after a 3–1 grand final win against Melbourne Victory.

During the 2013–14 W-League season, Foord scored four goals in eleven matches for Sydney FC. After sitting out many of the early season matches due to a foot injury, she scored a hat trick against Perth Glory in an 8–2 win on 5 January. Sydney FC finished in second place during the regular season with a   record. The team was eliminated in the semi-finals in a 2–1 defeat against Canberra United.

Sky Blue FC, 2013–15

In March 2013, it was announced that Foord had signed with American team, Sky Blue FC, for the inaugural season of the National Women's Soccer League (NWSL). In 2013 she appeared in 15 games, helping Sky Blue to their only playoff appearance in club history. She was named to the 2013 NWSL Second XI Team.

Foord returned to Sky Blue for the 2014 NWSL Season and was in the starting lineup for 20 out of her 21 appearances. Sky Blue finished the season in sixth place.

In February 2015, Foord agreed to return to Sky Blue alongside fellow Matildas teammate Samantha Kerr. Due to the 2015 FIFA Women's World Cup, they did not join the Sky Blue until July. Foord appeared in the final 10 games of the 2015 NWSL season. The team finished in eighth place with a  record.

After being listed on Sky Blue's preseason roster for the 2016 NWSL Season, Foord did not participate in preseason training and did not play for Sky Blue during the 2016 season. In December 2016 it was reported that Foord would not play in the NWSL in 2017 either as she was signing with a team in Japan. Reports later emerged about poor long-term conditions for players in terms of housing, travel, and training facilities.

Loan to Perth Glory, 2014–16
In August 2014, Foord signed a one-year deal to join Perth Glory for the 2014 W-League season. In 12 appearances for Perth, Foord scored 5 goals.

Foord re-signed with Perth of the 2015-16 W-League season. On 2 January 2016 Foord suffered a broken collar bone that required surgery. This injury ruled her out for the remainder of the season.

Return to Sydney FC, 2016–17
On 13 September 2016, Sydney FC announced that Foord had signed with the club. She would be returning to the club where she had previously played for four seasons. In 10 matches for Sydney during the 2016-17 W-League season, she played 766 minutes and scored 2 goals.

Vegalta Sendai Ladies, 2017
In January 2017, Japan Women's Football League club Vegalta Sendai Ladies announced that the club had signed Foord on a one-year deal. Foord four goals in 17 games for the club and reported having a challenging time adapting to the unrelenting Japanese training schedule.

Second return to Sydney FC, 2017–20
On 15 December 2017, after her season had concluded in Japan, Foord returned to Sydney FC and re-signed for the 2017-18 W-League season. Foord scored 3 goals in 6 games and helped Sydney FC qualify for the playoffs. In the semi-final match against the Newcastle Jets Foord suffered a ruptured Lisfranc ligament which would require surgery. This injury would force her to miss the 2018 grand final against Melbourne City. Melbourne won the game 2–0.

In the 2018–19 W-League season, Foord scored her second career W-League hat-trick on 9 December 2018 against the Brisbane Roar. Her three goals helped Sydney to a 5–1 victory, ending their three-game losing streak.

Foord briefly returned to Sydney for the 2019–20 W-League season, scoring 2 goals in 9 appearances before leaving early to pursue an opportunity with Arsenal in January 2020.

Portland Thorns, 2018–19
On 11 January 2018, Foord's rights in the NWSL were traded from Sky Blue to Seattle Reign FC for Katie Johnson and Rebekah Stott. Her rights were subsequently traded to the Portland Thorns FC along with a 2020 NWSL 2nd Round draft pick in exchange for US international midfielder Allie Long. However, Foord was still playing in the W-League at the time and suffered a serious foot injury in the semi-final that required surgery. As a result, she didn't make her debut for the Thorns until 6 August 2018. On 14 April 2019, Foord scored her first goal for Portland, in a 2–0 win over Orlando Pride.

On 8 January 2020, Foord's NWSL rights were traded to Orlando Pride along with Emily Sonnett and two draft picks in exchange for Orlando's No. 1 overall selection in the 2020 NWSL College Draft.

Arsenal, 2020–present

On 24 January 2020, Foord left Sydney FC to sign for FA WSL club Arsenal, becoming the fifth Australian to move to the league during the 2019–20 season. She made her debut for the club on 23 February 2020, scoring in a 2–0 FA Cup victory over second division club Lewes. The following week, Foord made her second appearance, this time playing the full 90 minutes as Arsenal lost the 2020 FA Women's League Cup Final against Chelsea on 29 February.

During the 2020–21 season, Foord scored a goal in the 60th minute of the team's 3–1 win against Bristol City. On 18 October, she scored a brace against Tottenham Hotspur helping lift Arsenal to a 6–1 win.

International career
Foord has represented Australia on the senior national team as well as the under-17 and under-16 national teams. As part of the Australian under-16 national team, Foord helped the team to progress through to the AFC U17 Women's Championship undefeated by scoring a hat-trick in a match against the Philippines.

Senior national team, 2011–present

Foord made her debut for the Australia national team, the Matildas, on 12 May 2011 in a friendly against New Zealand in Gosford. She scored a goal in her debut, as Australia won the match 3–0.

At the age of 16, Foord was named to the Matildas squad for the 2011 FIFA Women's World Cup in Germany. Foord started in two of the three group matches as a right back. She then started in the midfield for Australia's quarter-final match against Sweden. She returned to the full-back position after Ellyse Perry was substituted for Tameka Butt in the 59th minute. The Matildas were eliminated from the competition after losing the match 3–1. Foord was given the "Best Young Player" award for the tournament.

As a result of her play at the 2011 Women's World Cup, Foord was named AFC Youth Player of the year for 2011.

Foord was named to the Australian roster for the 2014 AFC Women's Asian Cup. She appeared in all 5 matches for Australia and scored a goal in their 2–2 draw against Japan in the group stage. Australia lost 1–0 to Japan in the final, but had already clinched a qualifying spot at the 2015 FIFA Women's World Cup.

In 2015 Foord was named to her second World Cup squad, this time as a forward. At the 2015 World Cup, Foord played every minute of Australia's five matches, as the Matildas were eliminated in the quarter-finals by AFC rival, Japan.

Foord competed in her first Olympics in 2016. She scored a goal in Australia's 2–2 draw against Germany in the group stage. Australia was eliminated in the quarter-finals by Brazil on penalties.

In December 2016, Foord was named AFC Player of the year, becoming only the second player to win youth and senior player of the year awards.

At the 2017 Tournament of Nations Foord scored two goals against Brazil, en route to a 6–1 Australian victory. Australian won the inaugural edition of the tournament.

Due to the foot injury she suffered in February 2018 during the W-League semi-final, Foord would miss the 2018 Algarve Cup and the 2018 AFC Women's Asian Cup. She made her return to the Matildas line-up at the 2018 Tournament of Nations, where she made three substitute appearances.

Foord scored her first international hat-trick in a friendly game against Chile on 13 November 2018, Australia won the match 5–0.

In May 2019, Foord was named to her third World Cup Team. At the World Cup, Foord played in all four of Australia's matches. She scored a goal in the group stage against Brazil helping Australia overcome a 2–0 deficit to win 3–2. Australia was eliminated by Norway in the Round of 16.

Foord was selected for the Matildas team which qualified for the Tokyo 2020 Olympics. The Matildas advanced to the quarter-finals with one victory and a draw in the group play. In the quarter-finals they beat Great Britain 4–3 after extra time. However, they lost 1–0 to Sweden in the semi-final and were then beaten 4–3 in the bronze medal playoff by USA. On 8 April 2022, she played her 100th match for Australia in a 2–1 win over New Zealand in a friendly match.

In popular media

In 2013, Foord was featured in an hour-long episode of ESPN's Aussies Abroad entitled, The Matildas, which profiled four Australian national team players (Foord, Lisa De Vanna, Kyah Simon, and Samantha Kerr) and their experience playing internationally. She starred in the film, Back Of The Net.

Foord was featured along with her national teammates in the EA Sports' FIFA video game series starting in FIFA 16, the first time women players were included in the game.

Personal life
Foord, Lindsey Horan, and Emily Sonnett (her former Portland Thorns FC teammates) have matching tattoos.
In 2022 Caitlin along with Jordan Nobbs and Jen Beattie joined the Gay Gooners on the Arsenal bus for Pride in London.

Career statistics

Club

International 

Scores and results list Australia's goal tally first, score column indicates score after each Foord goal.

Honors

Sydney FC
 W-League Premiership: 2010–11
 W-League Championship: 2012–13, 2018–19

Perth Glory
 W-League Premiership: 2014
Arsenal
 FA Women's League Cup: 2022–23

Australia U16
 AFF U-16 Women's Championship: 2009

Australia
 AFC Olympic Qualifying Tournament: 2016
 Tournament of Nations: 2017

Individual
FIFA Women's World Cup Best Women's Young Player: 2011
Asian Women's Young Footballer of the Year: 2011
Football Federation Australia U20 Women's Footballer of the Year: 2011
Asian Women's Footballer of the Year: 2016

See also 
 List of W-League (Australia) hat-tricks
 List of Nike sponsorships
 List of Australia women's international soccer players

References

Further reading 
 Grainey, Timothy (2012), Beyond Bend It Like Beckham: The Global Phenomenon of Women's Soccer, University of Nebraska Press, 
 Stay, Shane (2019), The Women's World Cup 2019 Book: Everything You Need to Know About the Soccer World Cup, Books on Demand, 
 Theivam, Keiran and Jeff Kassouf (2019), The Making of the Women's World Cup: Defining stories from a sport's coming of age, Little, 
 Various (2019), Stand Up for the Future, Penguin Random House, 
 Williams, Jean (2007), A Beautiful Game: International Perspectives on Women's Football, A&C Black, 
 Williams, Lydia (2019), Saved!, Allen & Unwin,

External links

 
 Profile at Football Federation Australia
 Profile at Portland Thorns FC
 
 
 Football-lineups.com tactical profile

1994 births
Living people
Australian women's soccer players
Central Coast Mariners FC (A-League Women) players
Sydney FC (A-League Women) players
Perth Glory FC (A-League Women) players
Mynavi Vegalta Sendai Ladies players
Australia women's international soccer players
2011 FIFA Women's World Cup players
2015 FIFA Women's World Cup players
Footballers at the 2016 Summer Olympics
New South Wales Institute of Sport alumni
NJ/NY Gotham FC players
National Women's Soccer League players
A-League Women players
Expatriate women's soccer players in the United States
Asian Young Footballer of the Year winners
Women's association football wingers
Women's association football defenders
Australian expatriate sportspeople in the United States
Olympic soccer players of Australia
2019 FIFA Women's World Cup players
Portland Thorns FC players
Arsenal W.F.C. players
Women's Super League players
Australian expatriate sportspeople in England
Footballers at the 2020 Summer Olympics
FIFA Century Club
Sportswomen from New South Wales
Soccer players from New South Wales
Expatriate women's footballers in England
Expatriate women's footballers in Japan
Australian expatriate sportspeople in Japan
Australian expatriate women's soccer players